Nicklas Dahlberg (born April 20, 1985 in Danderyd) is a Swedish professional ice hockey Goaltender. He is currently playing with Frisk Asker Tigers of the Norwegian GET-ligaen. He was influential when Skellefteå AIK surprisingly fended off Linköping in the 2009 playoff quarter finals, stopping more than 60 shots in the final match.

References

External links

1985 births
Living people
Frisk Asker Ishockey players
Modo Hockey players
Örebro HK players
Skellefteå AIK players
IF Sundsvall Hockey players
Swedish ice hockey goaltenders
Swedish expatriate ice hockey players in Norway